Estiva Gerbi is a municipality in the state of São Paulo in Brazil. The population is 11,407 (2020 est.) in an area of 74.1 km². The elevation is 590 m.

References

Municipalities in São Paulo (state)